Mark Oakland Fax (15 June 1911 – 2 January 1974) was an American composer and a professor of music.

Child prodigy
Born on June 15, 1911, in Baltimore, Maryland, Fax was a child prodigy.  By age fourteen, Fax was employed as a theater organist playing scores to silent films in Baltimore's Regent Theater on Saturdays, and gospel music at an African American church on Sundays. Fax enrolled at Syracuse University on the advice of his brother, Elton Fax, an artist, who believed Syracuse faculty would take his aspirations as a classical composer seriously.

Education
Mark studied at Syracuse University where he earned a B.Mus. in 1933, then at Eastman earning a Master's degree in composition. While at Eastman he studied with Howard Hanson.  He completed his bachelor's of music degree with honours; won the prestigious Julius Rosenwald Fellowship in a national competition; and was elected to the All-University Honour Society. Depression-era conditions compelled him to turn down graduate fellowship offers, and he accepted a position at Paine College in Georgia, where he founded and chaired the music department. in 1942 Mark studied piano at Bennington College in Vermont. It was here that he wrote music for the Martha Graham Dance Troupe.

Career
Feeling that he was stagnating artistically, he returned to Central New York in 1942 to study advanced composition at the Eastman School of Music. To support his family, he served as both choirmaster and janitor at a Rochester church until he won a rare second Rosenwald Fellowship. He taught at Black Mountain College in 1946. Max also taught music at Paine College a (1934-1942),.  From 1947 to 1972, Fax taught music theory at Howard University and served as director of the School of Music.  Later, Fax became Acting Dean of Howard's College of Fine Arts.  Concurrently, he served as music director at Washington's famed Asbury Methodist Church Washington, DC where he has acted as the music director, organist, and composer. Fax composed works for chorus, symphony, chamber ensemble, voice, piano and organ, in addition to two full-length operas, Christmas Miracle (1958) and 'Til Victory Is Won (1967). Though many of Fax's compositions are unpublished many had been preserved by his wife and reproduced in dissertation on his work by Velma Jones, titled "The Life and Works of Mark Oakland Fax."

Public attention
In the Washington limelight, he finally received public attention. Washington Post critic Paul Hume praised Fax's Sonata for Clarinet and Piano as "striking…difficult…a work of surprising contrapuntal texture" and declared the composer's oeuvre "music of rare power." 'Til Victory is Won (1967), Fax's epic operatic history of the African American experience, was mounted at the Kennedy Center. Hume says of Fax's opera  ""A strong and valid artistic pronouncement" upon the trials of the time it was written. Mark Fax died January 2, 1974, in Washington, DC.

Works list

Voice 

 Deep river
 Dreams
 Five Black Songs (Advice to a child; Love; Only Dreams; Selfishness; The Refused)
 From an unknown soldier
 Go tell it on the mountain
 Great day!
 If he only walked in gardens
 Impulse
 Inspiration
 Longing
 Love
 May Day song
 Night truths
 Rain song
 Rondel
 Sunset
 Three Tenor Songs for the Worship Service (All people of the Earth; Dear Master in Whose Life; Wedding Song, Entreat me not to leave thee)
 Whatsoever a man soweth
 Who can find a virtuous woman?

Instrumental 

 Three piano pieces
 Toccatina
 Three organ pieces
 The lost zoo. Symphonic suite

Opera 

 A Christmas Miracle
 Till Victory is Won

Reference List

External links 
  Center for Black Music Research (Columbia College Chicago).
North Carolina Digital Online Collection of Knowledge and Scholarship (NCDOCKS). https://libres.uncg.edu/ir/uncg/listing.aspx?id=8884
Discogs Marketplace.  https://www.discogs.com/artist/4851264-Mark-Fax

1911 births
1974 deaths
20th-century classical composers
20th-century American composers
20th-century American male musicians
American classical composers
American male classical composers
Black Mountain College faculty
Eastman School of Music alumni
Howard University faculty
Musicians from Baltimore
Syracuse University alumni